(Lord Jesus Christ, true Man and God), 127, is a cantata by Johann Sebastian Bach for use in a Lutheran service. He composed the chorale cantata in 1725 in Leipzig for the Sunday , the Sunday before Lent. It is based on Paul Eber's 1582 hymn in eight stanzas "". Bach first performed it on 11 February 1725.

History and words 
Bach held the position of Thomaskantor (director of church music) in Leipzig from 1723. During his first year, beginning with the first Sunday after Trinity, he wrote a cycle of cantatas for the occasions of the liturgical year. In his second year he composed a second annual cycle of cantatas, which was planned to consist exclusively of chorale cantatas, each based on one Lutheran hymn.

Bach composed the chorale cantata  for Estomihi (Quinquagesima), the last Sunday before Lent, when Leipzig observed tempus clausum and no cantatas were performed.

The prescribed readings for the Sunday were taken from the First Epistle to the Corinthians, "praise of love", and from the Gospel of Luke, healing the blind near Jericho. The Gospel also announces the Passion. The text is based on the funeral song "" in eight stanzas by Paul Eber (1562). The hymn suites the Gospel, stressing the Passion as well as the request of the blind man in the final line of the first stanza: "" (Be merciful to me, a sinner). The song further sees Jesus' path to Jerusalem as a model for the believer's path to his end in salvation. An unknown librettist kept the first and the last stanza and paraphrased the inner stanzas in a sequence of recitatives and arias. Stanzas 2 and 3 were transformed to a recitative, stanza 4 to an aria, stanza 5 to a recitative, stanzas 6 and 7 to another aria.

Bach first performed the cantata on 11 February 1725. It is the second to last chorale cantata of his second annual cycle, the only later one being Wie schön leuchtet der Morgenstern, BWV 1, for the feast of Annunciation which was celebrated even if it fell in the time of Lent.

Scoring and structure 
The cantata in five movements is richly scored for three vocal soloists (soprano, tenor and bass), a four-part choir, trumpet, two recorders, two oboes, two violins, viola and basso continuo.

 Chorale: 
 Recitative (tenor): 
 Aria (soprano): 
 Recitative and aria (bass): 
 Chorale:

Music 
The opening chorale is structured by an extended introduction and interludes. Its request "" (have mercy upon us) corresponds to the request of the blind man. A third chorale is quoted repeatedly in the continuo, "". Christoph Wolff notes that on Good Friday of that year Bach would perform the second version of his St John Passion, replacing the opening and the closing movement of the first version by music based on chorales, "" which would become the final movement of the first part of the St Matthew Passion, and again "".

Bach chose a rare instrumentation for the first aria, the oboe plays a melody, supported by short chords in the recorders, in the middle section  (funeral bells) are depicted by pizzicato string sounds. Movement 4 illustrates the Day of Judgement. On the text "" (When one day the trumpets ring out), the trumpet enters. The unusual movement combines an accompagnato recitative with an aria, contrasting the destruction of heaven and earth with the security of the believers, the latter given in text and tune from the chorale. John Eliot Gardiner describes it as a "grand, tableau-like evocation of the Last Judgement, replete with triple occurrences of a wild 6/8 section when all hell is let loose in true Monteverdian concitato ("excited") manner". He compares it to the "spectacular double chorus" from the St Matthew Passion, .

The closing chorale is a four-part setting with attention to details of the text, such as movement in the lower voices on "" (also may our faith be always brave) and colourful harmonies on the final line "" (until we fall asleep contentedly).

BWV 127/1 (variant) 

A reworked and transposed version of the cantata's opening movement opens the second part of the Passion pasticcio Wer ist der, so von Edom kömmt.

Recordings 
The selection is taken from the listing on the Bach-Cantatas website.
 J. S. Bach: Cantatas BWV 67, 108 & 127, Karl Richter, Münchener Bach-Chor, Bayerisches Staatsorchester, Antonia Fahberg, Peter Pears, Kieth Engen, Teldec 1958
 J. S. Bach: Cantatas BWV 127 & BWV 171, Wolfgang Gönnenwein, Süddeutscher Madrigalchor, South West German Chamber Orchestra, Herrad Wehrung, Georg Jelden, Jakob Stämpfli, Cantate 1961
 Die Bach Kantate Vol. 40, Helmuth Rilling, Gächinger Kantorei, Bach-Collegium Stuttgart, Arleen Augér, Lutz-Michael Harder, Wolfgang Schöne, Hänssler 1980
 J. S. Bach: Das Kantatenwerk · Complete Cantatas · Les Cantates, Folge / Vol. 31, Gustav Leonhardt, Knabenchor Hannover, Collegium Vocale Gent, Leonhardt-Consort, soloist of the Knabenchor Hannover, Kurt Equiluz, Max van Egmond, Teldec 1982
 J. S. Bach: Complete Cantatas Vol. 11, Ton Koopman, Amsterdam Baroque Orchestra & Choir, Sibylla Rubens, Christoph Prégardien, Klaus Mertens, Antoine Marchand 1999
 Bach Cantatas Vol. 21: Cambridge/Walpole St Peter / For Quinquagesima Sunday (Estomihi) / For Annunciation / Palm Sunday / Oculi, John Eliot Gardiner, Monteverdi Choir, Choir of Clare College, Cambridge & Choir of Trinity College, Cambridge, English Baroque Soloists, Ruth Holton, James Oxley, Stephan Loges, Soli Deo Gloria 2000
 Bach Edition Vol. 20 – Cantatas Vol. 11, Pieter Jan Leusink, Holland Boys Choir, Netherlands Bach Collegium, Ruth Holton, Nico van der Meel, Bas Ramselaar, Brilliant Classics 2000
 J. S. Bach: Cantatas Vol. 34 – (Cantatas from Leipzig 1725), Masaaki Suzuki, Bach Collegium Japan, Carolyn Sampson, Gerd Türk, Peter Kooy, BIS 2005
 J. S. Bach: Jesus, deine Passion – Cantates BWV 22, 23, 127 & 159, Philippe Herreweghe, Collegium Vocale Gent, Dorothee Mields, Jan Kobow, Peter Kooy, Harmonia Mundi France 2007

Notes

References

Sources 
 
 Herr Jesu Christ, wahr' Mensch und Gott BWV 127; BC A 49 / Chorale cantata (Estomihi) Bach Digital
 BWV 127 Herr Jesu Christ, wahr' Mensch und Gott English translation, University of Vermont

Church cantatas by Johann Sebastian Bach
1725 compositions
Chorale cantatas